Andres Maimik (born 8 February 1970) is an Estonian film director, producer, screenwriter, cinematographer and actor.

Selected filmography

 2002 Agent Wild Duck (feature film; screenwriter)
 2006 Jan Uuspõld läheb Tartusse (feature film; director and screenwriter)
 2010 Taevalaul (animated film; role: voice)
 2014 Kirsitubakas (feature film; director and scenarist)
 2016 Luuraja ja luuletaja (feature film; director and screenwriter)		
 2016 Päevad, mis ajasid segadusse (feature film; in role: Margus)
 2017 Minu näoga onu (feature film; director and scenarist)	
 2017 Paha lugu: Kokkulepe (feature film; director and screenwriter)

References

Living people
1970 births
Estonian film directors
Estonian screenwriters
Estonian cinematographers
Estonian film editors
Estonian male film actors
Estonian male television actors
Tallinn University alumni
People from Tallinn